= Sustainuance =

Business magazine (2012–2014)

- August 2013 Anniversary Issue.
- Frequency: Monthly
- Publisher: Sameer Gore
- First issue: August 2012
- Final issue: 2014
- Country: India
- Based in: Mumbai
- Language: English

Sustainuance was an English-language business magazine that was published monthly in India by Saaga Interactive Pte Ltd. Its focus was on the sustainability industry. The name is a combination of the words "Sustain" and "Nuance".

The founding team included Sameer Gore (Executive Director & Publisher) & Uday Surve (Chairman).

Sustainuance magazine was first published in August 2012. However, owing to financial reasons, the magazine was closed down in 2014.

== Saaga Interactive ==
Founded in 2012, Saaga Interactive expanded into realty and publishing. It comprised two divisions: Saaga Infra Projects Lts and Ananya Resorts and Residences Ltd.
